Dolichognatha is a genus of tropical and subtropical long-jawed orb-weavers that was first described by Octavius Pickard-Cambridge in 1869. Originally placed with the Archaeidae, it was transferred to the Araneidae in 1967, and to the Tetragnathidae in 1981.

Species
 it contains thirty-two widely distributed species:
Dolichognatha aethiopica Tullgren, 1910 – East Africa
Dolichognatha albida (Simon, 1895) – Sri Lanka, Thailand
Dolichognatha baforti (Legendre, 1967) – Congo
Dolichognatha bannaensis Wang, Zhang & Peng, 2020 — China
Dolichognatha comorensis (Schmidt & Krause, 1993) – Comoros
Dolichognatha cygnea (Simon, 1893) – Venezuela
Dolichognatha deelemanae Smith, 2008 – Borneo
Dolichognatha ducke Lise, 1993 – Brazil
Dolichognatha erwini Brescovit & Cunha, 2001 – Brazil
Dolichognatha incanescens (Simon, 1895) – Sri Lanka, Indonesia (Borneo), New Guinea, Australia (Queensland)
Dolichognatha junlitjri (Barrion-Dupo & Barrion, 2014) – Philippines
Dolichognatha kampa Brescovit & Cunha, 2001 – Brazil
Dolichognatha kratochvili (Lessert, 1938) – Congo
Dolichognatha lodiculafaciens (Hingston, 1932) – Guyana
Dolichognatha lonarensis Bodkhe & Manthen, 2015 – India
Dolichognatha longiceps (Thorell, 1895) – India, Myanmar, Thailand
Dolichognatha mandibularis (Thorell, 1894) – Indonesia (Sumatra)
Dolichognatha mapia Brescovit & Cunha, 2001 – Brazil
Dolichognatha maturaca Lise, 1993 – Brazil
Dolichognatha minuscula (Mello-Leitão, 1940) – Guyana
Dolichognatha nietneri O. Pickard-Cambridge, 1869 (type) – Sri Lanka
Dolichognatha pentagona (Hentz, 1850) – USA to Venezuela
Dolichognatha petiti (Simon, 1884) – Congo, Equatorial Guinea (Bioko)
Dolichognatha pinheiral Brescovit & Cunha, 2001 – Brazil
Dolichognatha proserpina (Mello-Leitão, 1943) – Brazil
Dolichognatha quadrituberculata (Keyserling, 1883) – Peru
Dolichognatha quinquemucronata (Simon, 1895) – Sri Lanka
Dolichognatha raveni Smith, 2008 – New Guinea, Australia (Queensland)
Dolichognatha richardi (Marples, 1955) – Samoa
Dolichognatha spinosa (Petrunkevitch, 1939) – Panama
Dolichognatha tigrina Simon, 1893 – Caribbean, northern South America
Dolichognatha umbrophila Tanikawa, 1991 – Taiwan, Japan (Okinawa Is.)

In synonymy:
D. tuberculata (Keyserling, 1893) = Dolichognatha pentagona (Hentz, 1850)

See also
 List of Tetragnathidae species

References

External links 
 

Araneomorphae genera
Cosmopolitan spiders
Taxa named by Octavius Pickard-Cambridge
Tetragnathidae